List of handball clubs in England sorted by league:

Men's Clubs

Men's Super 8 English National League

The 2012/13 season saw the introduction of the Men's Super 8 English National League consisting of the top eight teams in England.

Championship North 
Teams for the 2016/17 season:
Bolton Hussars
Deva HC
Liverpool HC
Manchester HC
University of Loughborough

Championship South 
Teams for the 2016/17 season:
 Brighton Seahawks
 Carshalton Titans
 Cranfield
 Islington
 Oly Cats
 Poole Phoenix

South West Regional Development League 
Teams for the 2016/17 season:
Bath Bombs HC
Bristol HC
Poole Phoenix - 2nd VII
Reading Lions
Southampton University
South Wales Handball
Stroud
University of Bath

South East Regional Development League 
Teams for 2016/17 season:

Tier 1
Cambridge HC 2nd Team
London GD HC 2nd Team
Olympia (London) HC 2nd Team
Thames HC
West London Eagles 2nd Team

Tier 2A
Essex Handball Club
Medway HC
Norwich HC
University of Kent

Tier 2B
Chelsea HC
Islington HC 2nd Team
Newham Flames
Oxford University

Midlands Regional Development League 
Teams for 2016/17 season:
Coventry Sharks 2nd Team
Nottingham 2nd Team
University of Birmingham HC
University of Lincoln HC
University of Loughborough HC
Warwick University HC

North Regional Development League  
Teams for 2016/17 season:
Leeds Carnegie Handball Club
Liverpool Speke Garston
Manchester HC 2nd Team
Newcastle Vikings
Sunderland Handball Club
University of Leeds

Women's Clubs

Women's Premier Handball League 
Teams for 2016/17
Cambridge HC
Coventry Sharks
London Angels
London GD Handball Club
NEM Hawks
Olympia HC
West London Eagles HC

South West Regional Development League 
Teams for the 2016/17 season
Bristol HC
Poole Phoenix
Reading Lionesses
Southampton University
Stroud
University of Bath

North Regional Development League  
Teams for 2016/17 season
Leeds Carnegie Handball Club
Liverpool HC
Manchester HC
Newcastle Vikings
Peninsula
University of Leeds

Midlands Regional Development League 
Teams for 2016/17 season
Cranfield
University of Birmingham HC
University of Loughborough HC
University of Loughborough HC 2nd team
Warwick University HC

South East Regional Development League 
Teams for 2016/17 season

Tier 1
Islington
London GD HC 2nd Team
Medway Dragons
Olympia (London) HC 2nd Team
Oxford University

Tier 2
Brighton HC
Chelsea HC
Norwich HC
University of Kent

Community Based
Aberystwyth
Brighton Handball Club
Cardiff
City of Nottingham Handball Club
Coventry
Eastbourne
Gedling
Islington Handball Club
Chelsea Handball Club
Newcastle Vikings
Poole Phoenix
Peterborough
Reading
South Birmingham Handball Club
Stansted Supers
Stroud Handball Club
Swansea
Urban Handball
York
Shropshire Handball
Trafford Handball

University Based
Bath Bombs HC
Bournemouth
Brighton
Brunel
Cambridge University Handball Club
Coventry
Edge
Essex
Huddersfield
Imperial College London
Lancaster
Leeds
Loughborough
Middlesex University
Newcastle
Northumbria
University of Portsmouth
Royal Holloway
Sheffield Hallam
Sunderland
University of Bath
University of Birmingham
University of Chichester
University College London
Warwick 
Westminster Handball Club

Defunct

The Hull Handball League

Handball is known to have been played in Hull from 1958 to 1962. The clubs known to have competed in the league are 
 Asbestos
 Crawford Sports
 Hull Boys Club

Other Former Clubs

 Bebbington Boys
 Brentwood '72
 Coventry folded in 1983. A new club with the same name was established in 2012 
 Harrow Tech
 Ipswich, has now been re established within ipswich 
 John Quinn (Sheffield)
 Leicester '73
 Leicester Computer
 Leigh
 Killingworth Braves (Newcastle)
 Milton Keynes 1980
 Kingston Polytechnic
 Nuneaton Newdigate
 Nuneaton Tech
 Rose Heath
 Wakefield Metros
 Whitchurch (Bristol)
 Wolverhampton Polytechnic '83

References 

 http://eharesults.weebly.com/index.html
 https://web.archive.org/web/20110311203607/http://www.englandhandball.com/handball/index.cfm/info-point/find-a-team/

External links 
England Handball Association
Handball Blog

 
England sport-related lists
Handball
England
Handball
Lists of organisations based in England